Anna Milton is a fictional character portrayed by actress Julie McNiven on The CW Television Network's drama and horror television series Supernatural. First appearing in the fourth season, Anna is a fallen angel who champions humanity over her own kind; because she is fallen, she is a hunted fugitive of Heaven with a death sentence on her head. She is initially an ally to series protagonists Sam and Dean Winchester as well as to Castiel, but becomes an antagonist in her final episode when her method for averting the Apocalypse in the fifth season pits her against them.

Although McNiven received general praise for her debut and chemistry with actor Jensen Ackles, who portrays Dean, critics thought that the character lacked direction in her later appearances and questioned her ultimate betrayal.

Plot
Anna is involuntarily committed to a psychiatric hospital with a misdiagnosis of schizophrenia after she begins hearing voices and predicting the end of the world. Demons attempt to capture her in "I Know What You Did Last Summer" when they realize that the voices in her head are actually communications between angels, but Anna defends herself in a burst of telekinetic power and makes her escape from the hospital. Series protagonists Sam Winchester and Dean Winchester—hunters of supernatural creatures—are informed about Anna by their demonic ally Ruby. The three of them help protect Anna from both the demon Alastair and later, the angels Castiel and Uriel. When put into a hypnotic trance, Anna remembers that she herself used to be an angel in command of Castiel and Uriel. Longing to feel human emotions, she had removed her grace—an energy essential to angels—and was reborn as a human to the Miltons. Anna surmises that Castiel and Uriel have been ordered to kill her as punishment for the serious angelic crime of falling. To celebrate her last night on Earth, she has sex with Dean in his car; afterward, when Dean is asleep, he is visited in a dream by Uriel, who reveals that he has Anna's grace. Dean feigns surrender and provides Uriel with their location, as does Ruby with Alastair in order to fulfill their parts in a plan concocted by Sam. The angels and demons attack each other, giving Anna the opportunity to steal back her grace from a distracted Uriel. She then vanishes in a flash of light as she is restored to her angelic form.

Anna returns in "On the Head of a Pin" to try to dissuade Castiel from forcing Dean to torture Alastair for information about recent killings of angels. Castiel reveals that she is still a wanted fugitive of Heaven, and rejects her attempts to persuade him to help her, on the basis that she is fallen. When Castiel, having begun to have doubts about Heaven, goes to her for advice later in the episode, Anna tells him that he has to learn to think for himself. Anna reappears to kill Uriel—revealed to be the one responsible for the angel deaths—when he is attacking Castiel. She briefly appears in "The Rapture" to urge the Winchesters to find Castiel's now-missing vessel to find out the vitally important secret Castiel had wanted to tell Dean, for which Castiel has been taken back to Heaven to be punished for almost revealing. In the following episode "When the Levee Breaks", she confronts Castiel on having released Sam from his demon blood detox, only to be turned over to other angels by Castiel and taken to Heaven herself for punishment. She is subsequently imprisoned in Heaven's dungeon, where she is tortured for falling.

Anna makes her final appearance in the fifth season episode "The Song Remains the Same". Having escaped from Heaven and still committed to stopping the Apocalypse, she is now intent on killing Sam so that the recently freed Lucifer will not be able to use him as his vessel and thus the archangels Lucifer's and Michael's plans for the Apocalypse will fall apart, although Castiel questions if this is truly her will or the will Heaven imposed upon her using torture and brainwashing. To ensure that Sam cannot be resurrected for this purpose, she plans to destroy Sam's corpse and "scatter his cells across the universe." Realizing that she cannot kill Sam in the present with Castiel protecting him, Anna goes back in time to erase Sam and Dean from existence completely by killing their parents before Sam and Dean are born. Her first attempt fails due to the intervention of Sam and Dean, who have been sent to stop her by Castiel. Anna tricks the past's still-living Uriel into helping her and together they overpower the assembled Winchesters. Anna succeeds in killing Sam, but is soon after incinerated by Michael, who restores Sam to life and foils Anna's plan.

Characterization

Initially described to the press as "a haunted girl who, for mysterious reasons, is able to hear the secret conversations of angels in her head," Anna is eventually revealed as an angel who willingly fell from Heaven out of a "longing for the imperfection of humans." In executive producer Robert Singer's opinion, angels lack the human emotions that people "take for granted"—such as love, joy, and being hurt—because they "have to be perfect." Actress Julie McNiven, on the other hand, felt that angels do have the potential for emotions—both she and actor Misha Collins agreed that "there's something more there [between Anna and Castiel] than just being co-workers"—but are forced to suppress them by the militant atmosphere of Heaven. By becoming human, Anna overcame these constraints and fulfilled her desire to "feel things with free will."

McNiven only "felt weak" in the role of Anna when she was a "confused mental patient" whose "whole life just completely fell to pieces," with the character becoming "very strong" upon discovering the truth. Regarding Anna "totally [turning] a 180," McNiven elaborated that "it's not like she forgets that her parents are dead, it's just that she realizes that there's something more, that there's really no time to sit around and be vulnerable about her parents and her life." Deciding to return to her angelic form is a "big struggle" for the character, but McNiven believed that the restored Anna eventually "found a middle ground" because being on the run allowed her to make her own choices and thus feel human.

Castiel accuses Anna of having been re-converted to serving Heaven in "The Song Remains the Same," he himself having been previously brainwashed by Heaven, but Anna insists that she broke out of her prison and is acting alone. Although series writer Sera Gamble described Heaven's prison as a "terrible, terrible Bible camp" in which angels are "brainwashed back to the side of [Heaven]," McNiven agreed with her character that she was still operating independently of Heaven. She saw Anna's actions in the fifth season as being "motivated by what she believes to be the only solution to [the] Apocalypse." The actress admitted that Anna makes "hasty decisions," but felt that the character is "always trying to do what she thinks is right" for the good of humanity. The character is "very strong about [her convictions]" and thus "doesn't want to hear anything otherwise."

Development

Production envisioned Anna as "this one beautiful, frightened girl," and series creator Eric Kripke said that McNiven "blew [them] away with how likeable, vulnerable, and intelligent she made [her]." The actress auditioned for the role of a mental patient, unaware of the character's angelic nature, and only learned the truth when later asked to read scenes from "Heaven and Hell." Considering herself to still be in the early stages of her career, McNiven felt like she "could really bite into [the] role," and was especially pleased that her two-part debut provided the character with "an arc with a beginning, middle and an end."

To aid McNiven in her portrayal of a mental patient, production gave her a helpful "Girl, Interrupted critique." Knowledge of her character's angelic origins did not influence her performance in "I Know What You Did Last Summer" because she saw the character as someone who "truly is innocent." McNiven instead approached Anna by envisioning the traumatic experience that the character goes through, with the "power of knowing that she's not crazy" strengthening her. Though the character disappears at the end of "Heaven and Hell" once she becomes an angel again, Gamble assured fans that the writers were planning for Anna to reappear "soon" in the fourth season, which came to fruition in the episode "On the Head of a Pin."

Following Anna's arrest in the penultimate fourth season episode, the writers intended for Anna to appear in the fifth season episode "Good God, Y'All!" but had to cut her storyline due to time constraints. The character instead makes her only appearance in the season—as well as her final appearance in the series—in "The Song Remains the Same." McNiven found the visual effects of Anna's incineration "just really cool." Describing Anna's "big CGI'ed Grace explosion" in the episode "Heaven and Hell" as her "first bookend," McNiven felt like she was "being CGI'ed again in a slightly different way to end with a bookend there." Despite her character's death, McNiven expressed a desire to return to the series.

Due to the power and authority the character had before her fall from grace, Nathan Robert Brown, author of The Mythology of Supernatural: The Signs and Symbols Behind the Popular TV Show, theorized that Anna was either Raguel or Remiel of the seven archangels named in the Book of Enoch, which he saw as the basis of much of Supernaturals angel mythology. According to McNiven, however, Anna's true angelic identity is Anael, ruler of the second Heaven and of Thursdays in angelic lore. Brown as well as Kate Lloyd of The Official Supernatural Magazine noted that the character shares her surname with John Milton, author of the epic poem Paradise Lost.

Reception
Diana Steenbergen of IGN thought McNiven did an "excellent job" as Anna in "I Know What You Did Last Summer," finding the character "sympathetic immediately." She "sincerely [hoped]" that the actress would continue the role past "Heaven and Hell." Tina Charles of TV Guide "especially loved" Anna's introduction to the show, having recognized McNiven from her appearances on the series Mad Men. Steenbergen and Charles agreed with ''The San Diego Union-Tribunes Karla Peterson that McNiven shared a "low-key, sympathetic chemistry that worked beautifully" with actor Jensen Ackles, who plays Dean. Steenbergen and Peterson, however, felt that their love scenes did not reflect this chemistry, with the former finding that the "scene itself seems forced" and the latter describing it as "just strange."

Although Steenbergen enjoyed Anna's brief appearance in "The Rapture," she noted that the character "didn't add anything that furthered the storyline." Peterson and Charles likewise were confused by Anna's actions throughout the rest of the season. When Anna is captured by the angels in "When the Levee Breaks," Peterson commented that "if...she is out of the picture, you will hear no complaints from me," opining that McNiven was part of a larger trend of "weak" casting for Supernatural's female characters.

When Anna returns in "The Song Remains the Same," however, Peterson loved the "serious angel smackdown" that featured the "seriously pumped-up Anna." Anna's death disappointed her because she felt that McNiven started "really, really growing on us." Charles, on the other hand, described Castiel's intent to kill Anna as "a plan I can get behind" because she was threatening the Winchesters. Zack Handlen of The A.V. Club found it "nice to have Anna back," but called her "bizarrely random" because "it's hard to read what her character actually wants anymore." The lack of "some sense of what made her change sides" made her "too much a generic foe." Handlen described her death as a "waste of a character who, if not at a [Castiel] level of cool, had some potential," and thought that the writers killed her to "[clean] up loose ends." Although Maureen Ryan of the Chicago Tribune liked Anna in the fourth season, she criticized the character in "The Song Remains the Same" for "wasting time and randomly throwing [the Winchesters] around" rather than quickly killing them. In her opinion, Anna's final appearance merely served as a "plot device to put other things in motion."

Contrary to critical reception, McNiven believed that people did not initially like the character—notably because they "maybe didn't like the idea that an angel could fall" and saw her as "really selfish"—but over time saw her as a "strong female power character". Fans voted the actress "Best Female Guest Star" in The Official Supernatural Magazine'''s 2009 Supernatural Awards, which bolstered her belief.

References

Bibliography

Footnotes

Supernatural (American TV series) characters
Female characters in television
Fictional angels
Fictional characters with superhuman strength
Fictional characters who can teleport
Fictional characters with spirit possession or body swapping abilities
Fictional characters with dream manipulation abilities
Television characters introduced in 2008
Fictional women soldiers and warriors
Fictional murderers